Sidney Leggett was an English football inside right who played in the Football League for Clapton Orient.

Personal life 
Leggett served as a private in the British Army during the First World War.

References

English footballers
English Football League players
Leyton Orient F.C. players
Year of death missing
British Army personnel of World War I
1897 births
People from Hackney Central
Association football inside forwards
Fulham F.C. players
Tunbridge Wells F.C. players
Folkestone F.C. players
British Army soldiers